Qatari folklore largely revolves around sea-based activities and the accolades of renowned folk heroes. Like elsewhere on the Arabian Peninsula, folktales play an important role in Qatar's culture. Some of Qatar's folktales have a distinctive local character while others have been imparted by nomadic tribes wandering between the present-day Arab states of the Persian Gulf. Local folk stories were seldom documented, instead being passed down orally from generation to generation. After Qatar began profiting from oil exploration, the tradition of passing down these stories gradually ceased. Government ministries such as the Ministry of Culture and Sports and local universities have made efforts to preserve and transcribe local legends in publications.

Among Qatar's most noted folk heroes are Qatari ibn al-Fuja'a, a 7th-century war poet, and Rahmah ibn Jabir Al Jalhami, an 18th- and 19th-century pirate and transitory leader of Qatar. Recurring themes in Qatari folklore are djinn, pearl diving, and the sea.

Myths

May and Gilan

One myth that purportedly originates from Qatar is that of "May and Gilan", the latter of whom is said to be progenitor of the sail. According to tradition, in old times, a wealthy man named Ghilan resided in Al Khor. Besides commanding a crew of sailors and fishermen, he owned numerous pearling boats. As time passed, a woman named May, who commanded superior number of boats and crewmen, emerged as Ghilan's main adversary.

In an incident in which both crews were attempting to harvest the same pearl bed, May taunted Ghilan as her ship raced past his. This incensed Ghilan, who set out to discover a way to best his competitor. While observing a grasshopper, Ghilan took note of how its wings worked, and applied the same principle to his boats, giving rise to the sail. This enabled his boats to travel at higher speeds, allowing him to outpace May's boats to the densest pearl beds. The myth is typically presented in five sequences and is unlike most other known Bedouin stories. According to locals of Al Khor, the myth originated from the Al Muhannadi tribe of Al Khor. The story is not well-known elsewhere in Qatar.

Lord of the Sea
The "Lord of the Sea" tale is famous in Qatar as well as the rest of the Persian Gulf region. The story revolves around a water djinn named Bū Daryā, who terrorizes sailors and pearl divers. It remains a well-known tale among Qatar's older population, particularly those who worked in maritime activities.

The myth attains its name from the protagonist, Bū Daryā. In Arabic, "bu" or "abu" translates to "father", while "darya" originates from the Persian term for "sea". Although the second word has Persian origins, the myth has not been documented in any known Persian literature. An alternative name for the protagonist is "Šeytān Ìl-bahār", Arabic for "devil of the sea". Bū Daryā was seen as a terrifying and colossal half-human half-amphibian who preyed on those out at sea. Many sailors and pearl divers of the past were convinced of Bū Daryā's existence and took special precautions should they encounter him. In fact, according to one version of the myth, Bū Daryā would sneak onto unsuspecting ships at night before scurrying off with crew members whom he would devour, and in some cases would sink the ship. This provoked seaward travelers to take turns on night watch duty in case of an attack.

Wailing-like calls, similar to those of a siren, are reported in the second version of the myth. Unsuspecting sea travelers who would answer these pleas would face their doom at the hands of Bū Daryā. If a whole ship responded to the call, then its resources would be plundered and in most cases the ship would be sunk. As per this version, the only way to repel the hypnotic calling would be to repeat Quran verses. The second version represents a less fanciful depiction of Bū Daryā and contains more elements pertaining to the unknown dangers awaiting in unexplored and undocumented areas of the open sea. It also attempts to reconcile faith and religion with long-held customs in an effort to provide a moral to the story.

Folktales

Genres of folktales
Qatari folktales can be divided into four main categories: witticisms (torfah), anecdotes (nadirah), wisecracks (molhah) and jokes (noktah). The first genre, referred to as witticism in English, provides a combination of social criticism and sarcasm delivered in a witty manner. Humor is not necessary in witticisms; in fact, many witticisms do not highlight elements of humor, but of misfortune and misery. Nonetheless, this misery may be still be communicated in a lighthearted and exaggerated way for entertainment purposes.

An example of the witticism, or torfah genre, is the story of Far Boufarah Khayes Al-Merara, narrated by Qatari folklorist Ahmed Al Sayegh. In it, a delusional man kills a mouse with a sword and pridefully places it in front of his doorstep in an attempt to showcase his masculinity. When his wife notices the dead mouse, she does not share his enthusiasm and instead views it as the unnecessary slaughter of a defenseless creature. Incensed, the husband expresses his very strong dissatisfaction of his wife's attitude and threatens to divorce her. After his mother-in-law was informed of the incident by his wife, she pays him a visit and on entering the household, questions who it was that has slain the mighty lion at their doorstep. The husband arrogantly claimed responsibility and, encouraged by his mother-in-law's enabling of his delusional state, moved to forgive his wife for her perceived transgressions. Thus, witticisms can be seen as playing important social roles, with their morals often providing relevant and sensible advice to its listeners. In this context, the lesson taught is, that spouses may have to make compromises and entertain one another's egos, at least to a small extent, in order for a marriage to be successful. Other common morals taught by witticisms include knowing when to remain silent and being vigilant against thieves and fraudsters.

Morphology of folktales
According to Vladimir Propp's Morphology of the tale published in 1928, the prologue is an essential component of all folktales. A prologue is defined as the opening section of a story which describes its setting, characters and context. Most Qatari and other regional folktales begin with the phrase "Blessing of Allah be upon Muhammad" or a variant of this. Stories often revolve around multiple members of a family, and recurrent patterns can be seen in the family structure of protagonists, such as orphaned children, children with only one parent, and children with abusive stepparents. Examples of such settings can be found in the folktales of Al-Khadrabouna and Hamad and Hamda.

Folktales vary widely in theme, but jinn and the sea feature prominently in a number of stories. Common structures can be observed in Qatari folktales; with most tales starting with a basic demand, escalating to trials and tribulations, and ending with punishment and/or rewards. The aforementioned stories of Al-Khadrabouna and Hamad and Hamda as well as Al-Sofra wal Qadah wal Mushaab illustrate this structural archetype well.

In the Al-Khadrabouna tale, the prologue introduces an orphaned brother and sister. The plot of the story concerns the namesake, Al-Khadrabouna, a man whom the sister falls in love and whom her brother contacts on her behalf. A villain is found in the girl's neighbor, who sabotages their meeting out of jealousy and weds Al-Khadrabouna herself. In the dénouement, Al-Khadrabouna recognizes the neighbor's deceit and marries the sister instead.

Hamad and Hamda is a story about two starving orphan siblings who set out on a journey to find a wealthy philanthropic Sultan who they believe can help alleviate their dire straits. Their journey is fraught with trials as they stave off starvation before falling in a well. A malicious jinn who resides within the well then threatens and frightens the two siblings. As the jinn was asleep, a miracle occurs as a ring worn by Hamad is revealed to have magic powers upon contact with the well wall and conjures an out-stretched snake for the children to climb and escape. Once out of the well, Hamad uses his magic ring to teleport them in front of the Sultan's son whom chauffeurs Hamda and Hamad to the Sultan's palace. Shortly after, the Sultan's son to propose to Hamda. The story ends with both siblings being offered a residence at the palace.

The protagonist of Al-Sofra wal Qadah wal Mushaab is a woodworker who has a basic need for wood in order to earn a living and provide his family. As his area has been deforested, he had to embark on a journey in distant lands to find suitable clusters of trees. After arriving at a relatively densely treed area, he swung his axe into a tree thrice, only to summon a jinn on his third blow. The jinn identifies himself as a friendly spirit and awards the man with a magic table which conjures up food. Grateful, the man takes home the table and feeds his family, however, the family still complained of a lack of clothing and money. Therefore, the man returned the jinn, but upon the jinn's refusal for further assistance, he visited the Sultan and offered to trade him the table for supplies. He was scammed, being given only a pouch of rice and a sickly mule. He revisited and pleaded with the jinn, who this time provided him with a magic cup which would grant him anything he and his family should desire. He decided to take the cup to a blacksmith in order to secure it with chains to protect it against thieves. However, the blacksmith learned of the cup's secret and decided to pilfer it. This elicited the man to appeal to the genie for a third time, and was given a magical axe. The man then used this axe to exact revenge upon the blacksmith and Sultan, and was returned of his magical items.

Al-Anzroot

Al-Anzroot revolves around a young man who has trouble with verbal memory. The protagonist is sent on an errand by his wife to collect the al anzroot plant, a dry herb with medicinal values. Along the way he forgets the name of the plant, and repetitively murmurs "mafeesh" (nothing) to himself. As he is walking along the coast, he encounters two superstitious fishermen who attribute their lack of catch to his repetition of "mafeesh". Thus, they hit him on the head and ordered him to repeat "two big, two small" instead in the hopes that it would help their chances. He then happened upon a burial service. His incessant muttering of the phrase "two big, two small" deeply offended the grieving family, causing one of them to strike him upon the head and ask him to repeat "May God have patience and reward you" instead.

The next venue he appears at is a wedding ceremony, where he once again offends the audience by mourning their joyous occasion. This induced a member of the audience to slap his head and encourage him to instead say "May God bless your actions and bring you joy". In the proceeding twist of irony, he stumbles upon two siblings who are engaged in a physical altercation. The elder of the two turned and kicked the man after hearing him express happiness at their quarrel, and ordered him to state that "You should treat your brother better; be kind to him". This phrase was expressed while walking past a man who was shooing a dog away from a mosque, and the words were considered inappropriate by the onlooker. He thus hit him on his head, and asked that he repeat "Go away, dog!". Finally, the man's journey brought him to a leatherworker who was in the process of attempting to slice a piece of leather, holding it in his teeth while he steadied his incision. Hearing the words "Go away, dog!" deeply upset him, leading to yet another strike on the head and the leathersmith questioning him, "Do you want a slam with al-anzroot?", using the term as slang for a hardy, strong strike. Suddenly, the man remembered what he set out to find, and hugged the leathersmith in appreciation.

Classified as a witticism, the moral of this story is intended to inform listeners to be conscientious of their speech and to recognize that the setting of a social situation and the timing of an utterance are critical factors in determining the appropriateness of what is said.

The Golden Cow
A tale recounted by Dhabiya Abdullah Al Sulaiti, this story revolves around a wealthy trader whose three marriages ended after his wives' deaths, with only his last marriage bearing him any children; a girl. Convicted by his love for his infant daughter, he vowed never to remarry to prevent potential mistreatment of her by his would-be spouse. As his daughter matured into a teenager, he soon realized that his daughter would need the guidance and care of a woman. Thus, he questioned her whether she would approve of him remarrying, and when she answered affirmatively, he wedded a new spouse. Fueled by jealousy, the new spouse would routinely abuse his daughter when she was not in her father's presence. This culminated in the young girl planning a stealthy escape from her household. In accordance with her plan, she visited a jeweler and, after explaining her predicament, commissioned him to construct a large golden cow which she could be concealed in. After making daily visits for an unspecified period, the jeweler had finally finished her project. He obligingly gave the girl the key for the golden cow, which she crawled in before being put on storefront display.

On occasion, the shop would be browsed by none other than the Ruler's son. Upon his next visit to the shop, he decided to buy the golden cow and place it in his personal chambers. The Ruler's son, who was accustomed to dining in his chambers, finished his meal before briefly leaving and locking his doors. Upon the man's exit, the girl stealthily ejected from the effigy and consumed the leftovers before returning to her hiding place. Bewildered by the recurrent disappearance of his food, he questioned his mother and his maid, but could find no answers, leading him to devise a plan to get to the bottom of the mystery. The plan, which consisted of him hiding in his bed after receiving food from his mother, was a success as he managed to observe the girl go about her routine. He confronted her as she finished eating, questioning her identity and motives.

She confessed to the boy her mistreatment at the hands of her stepmother, and he was so swayed by her story that he offered her shelter. Furthermore, he requested that his mother bring food to his quarters every day, even on days that he would be away on international travels with his father. He refused to provide her with a reason when pressed, only stating that it was of the utmost importance that she respects his request.

While the boy was on one such travel with his father, his mother was approached by the boy's cousin who pleaded with her to allow the golden cow to a centerpiece at her wedding. The mother reluctantly agreed and the golden cow, as well as the girl, were transported to the bride's wedding chambers. The next morning, when the girl awoke and arose from the cow for her morning breakfast, she was greeted by unfamiliar surroundings and the bride herself. A tense moment of silence briefly occurred between the two girls, before the bride, worrying that the young girl's beauty would attract the interests of her suitor, beat up and ejected the girl from her chambers.

In a poor state after being beat up and left hungry, the girl passed out on the street only to be found by Fattoum, an elderly female water carrier. As Fattoum hadn't any children of her own, she saw their meeting as a blessing, and after arriving back home she continued to provide the girl with food and medical treatment. Meanwhile, the golden cow had been returned to the mother of the Ruler's son, but the next day she noticed a peculiarity as the food she had brought to his chambers remained untouched. She informed her son of this peculiarity upon his return, prompting him to ascertain whether the cow had been lent to anyone in his absence. When his mother answered truthfully, the boy fell into a deep depression. Subsequent medical visits could not determine the cause of his condition, hence he remained confined to his bed for years on end. Eventually, the boy's family opted for a stay-at-home folk healer who promised that he would be able to cure their son, but that it may take a period of months or even a year.

The folk healer would regularly mix concoctions of flour and water which he would then heat in different townfolk's ovens before feeding the resulting bread to the Ruler's son. Nonetheless, no improvements were noted after eight months, leading many to suspect the folk healer of fraud. Suddenly, a moment of realization dawned on the folk healer after he concluded that he had borrowed every townsperson's oven except for Fattoum. He sent servants to Fattoum's house to carry out the same procedure, and after three consecutive days of feeding the Ruler's son bread baked in her oven, the boy started to show signs of recovery. It was suggested by the folk healer that it was not the bread, but instead the baker who was aiding his recovery.

After Fattoum was questioned by the folk healer over the seemingly magical qualities of her bread, she reluctantly revealed that she was assisted by the young girl, and gave her up under the condition that she would be safeguarded from her stepmother. Fattoum also decided that she would see the young girl to the palace. Upon their arrival, the Ruler's son was overcome with happiness. He enthusiastically declared that it was "Allah's will" that Fattoum and the young girl came across one another, before offering her a residence in the palace alongside her new daughter and proposing to the young girl.

The Thorn Tree
This story starts off with an aging married woman who has yet to bear a child. While wandering through her neighborhood one day, her dress became entangled in a thorn tree, which she saw as a sign from God. At that point, she promised to God that if she were to be blessed with a child, then her child would look after the thorn tree. Over time, she fell pregnant and gave birth to a girl. As time went on and the girl aged, she had a mystifying incident while playing with her friends in the neighborhood in which she heard the tree demand that she hold her mother to her promise, "or else a grave will be dug for you". Unaware of what this meant, she ran home to report the incident to her mother. After her mother explained the original promise she made, she instructed her daughter on how to care for tree, reminding her to water it daily.

The tree gradually improved in health and appearance over the subsequent years. On one occasion while the girl was watering the tree, a man, who was unknown to her, stopped by the tree and asked her how many leaves the tree had, to which she replied with a question of her own: "how many stars are in the sky?" This back-and-forth exchange was repeated for a few days. The man, feeling disrespected that his question was answered with sarcasm, visited a local elderly woman named Umm Al-Heilan who was renowned for her cruelness in the hopes that he could learn of a way to win the argument. Umm Al-Heilan informed him that the girl comes by her house daily to play with her daughters, and proposed that he dress in woman's attire, i.e. an abaya and face veil, in order to trick the girl. The next day, the man did as was suggested by Umm Al-Heilan, and met the girl while she was visiting, exchanging pleasantries which included hugging and kissing on the cheek.

On the next day, as the girl made her way to the tree, she encountered the same man waiting for her on horseback. They exchanged the same words as previous occasions, except for when the girl retorted with her question, she was stunned when the man revealed his plan the prior day, claiming that she should feel humiliated for having been tricked into kissing and hugging a male stranger. Angered by his deceit, she decided to invite the man for coffee under the tree the following day, during which she would have her revenge. Equipped with herbal medicines, food and alcohol, she rendezvoused with the man as planned, and plied him with alcohol until he passed out from intoxication. Although the man was found and taken home to his family, his recovery was slow and painful. Within the following days, the girl, disguised in traditional male clothing (including a ghutra, agal and thawb) peddled her herbal medicines throughout the neighborhood in the hopes that the man's family would employ her services. Her plan worked, and the man recovered in a matter of days. After fully recovered, he returned to the thorn tree, once again gloating of his deceitful trick and inquiring whether the girl was embarrassed. She responded by confessing that she had gotten him intoxicated, put cucumbers in his mouth and had successfully cured him. The man, astounded by her confession, could do no more than admit defeat.

Kaltham Ali Al Ghanem was responsible for collating this particular folktale and documenting it in the second edition of Studies of Qatari Folklore, published by the Ministry of Culture and Sports.

A'ssoom and A'rooy

Two sheep named A'ssoom and A'rooy are the main protagonists in this story recorded by Dhabiya Mohammed Al Khater. The story starts off in spring when the two sheep are grazing away from home. Strong rains started falling, inducing A'ssoom to try and convince A'rooy to return to their farm. A'rooy refused this suggestion in song, causing A'ssoom to feel humiliated. In retaliation, A'ssoom went to the wolf and asked him to devour A'rooy.

The wolf declined A'ssooy's proposition, prompting her to ask the dog to hunt the wolf. When he declined, she went to their owner and asked him to abuse the dog. Upon his refusal, she ventured to the barber and requested that he shave off her owner's beard. Again daunted by refusal, she suggested to the fire that it set the barber's hut ablaze; this too was declined. When she asked the water to extinguish the fire, it refused, so she asked the camel to disperse the water, but was still met with refusal. She attempted to convince the gadash (a type of insect) to sting the camel, but he did not accept. In her final plea, she begged the rooster to scare the gadash into compliance, and was at last met with acceptance.

After the rooster successfully startled the gadash, it attacked the camel, causing the camel to leap in and disperse the water, some of which spilled into the fire, inducing the fire to set the barber's house ablaze. The distraught barber then cut off the man's beard, which angered him into beating his dog, and in turn his dog pursued the wolf. Upon the wolf's arrival at the farmhouse, there was no sign of A'rooy, so he ironically consumed A'ssoom instead.

Fictional beings
Most of the figures from Islamic mythology are present in Qatari folklore, including angels, jinn (spirits), shaitan (devils), houris, and ghouls.

As mentioned in the "Lord of the Sea" myth, the protagonist Bū Daryā is a malevolent half-man half-amphibian, who, according to some versions, attracts seafarers with a wailing call.  This being bears some semblance with other sea-based mythological figures such as mermen and sirens. It is speculated that, since Bū Daryā is locally referred to as the 'lord of the sea', this myth may pre-date Wahhabism in Qatar since Wahhabi doctrine explicitly prohibits any entity other than Allah from being referred to as 'lord'.

Talking animals, a universal element that is present across all cultures, are common in Qatari folklore.

Folk heroes

Qatari ibn al-Fuja'a, a seventh-century war poet who was born in modern-day northern Qatar, is revered as a folk hero in the country.

A more contemporary folk hero can be found in Rahmah ibn Jabir Al Jalhami, an 18th- and 19th-century pirate and transitory ruler of the Qatar Peninsula. In his time, he was known as the "Scourge of the Pirate Coast". He also features prominently in Saudi folklore, specifically that of its Eastern Province.

Sheikh Jassim bin Mohammed Al Thani, often referred to as "The Founder", is a prominent folkloric figure, particularly due to his military achievements, his charitable donations and his promotion of Islam. He ruled Qatar for a period of over 30 years starting in 1878.

Preservation
After oil operations commenced in Qatar, a dramatic shift on societal customs was witnessed, resulting in a loss of cultural heritage. As folk stories were rarely documented in the past, there has been an urgency by Qatari authorities to preserve and record as much oral history as can be remembered. In particular, the Ministry of Culture and Sports (MCS) and local universities have been at the forefront of these efforts to transcribe Qatari folklore. The MCS and universities in Education City often collaborate with each other by jointly authoring books on Qatari folklore and organizing conferences.

In 1983, a joint effort was launched by the Gulf Cooperation Council (GCC) states known as the Arab Gulf States Folklore Centre (AGSFC, later renamed the GCC States Folklore Centre), and was headquartered in Qatar's capital city, Doha. The center was responsible for releasing books in Arabic and English, holding conferences and organizing workshops related to Persian Gulf heritage. Furthermore, the center published a quarterly journal known as Al-Ma'thurat al-Sha'biya.

References

 
Folklore by country